Cherifa Chamia, better known by her artist name Safia Chamia (Arabic: صفية الشامية), (born January 3, 1932 Lebanon – died December 17, 2004), was a Tunisian singer, and actress.

Life 
Her father was Algerian and her mother was Turkish. During her stay in Paris, Safia met the artist Mohamed Jamoussi who wrote and composed the songs for her. Mahla kadek, ya Kalbi ma zelt sghir, ache fi omrek ma yétlaoueh, and an operetta called Fatma ou Hamada.

She was discovered by the artist Abderrahman El Khatib who heard her sing on the occasion of the birthday of her older sister in Lebanon, he composed her first song titled Haouel ya ghanem haouel.

She arrived in Tunis in 1946 and her neighbor, who often heard her sing, introduced her to Mustapha Bouchoucha, head of the musical service of Radio Tunis, who offered to take the pseudonym of Safia, from the name of a famous Turkish singer.

She quickly mastered the genre of Tunisian music and won recognition throughout the country and particularly with the ministry of culture.

Died on December 17, 2004 at the age of 73, she was buried on December 18 in the Sidi Yahia cemetery of El Omrane in Tunis.

References 

Tunisian stage actresses
Tunisian people of Turkish descent
Tunisian people of Algerian descent
Lebanese emigrants to Tunisia
Lebanese people of Algerian descent
Lebanese people of Turkish descent
1932 births
2004 deaths
20th-century Tunisian actresses
20th-century Tunisian  women singers